() is one of the three main pillars of the teachings of Guru Nanak, the founder of the Sikhism. The other two pillars are Naam Japo and Kirat Karo. It means to share what you have and to consume it together as a community. This could be wealth, food. etc. The term is also used to mean to share ones wealth with others in the community, to give to charity, to distribute in Langar and to generally help others in the community who need help. A Sikh is expected to contribute a portion of their wealth or income to people in need or to a worthy cause.

An alternative spelling and meaning, "Vand Ke Chakna", means to share the fruits of one’s labor with others before considering oneself, thus living as an inspiration and a support to the entire community.

Guru Ji says in the Guru Granth Sahib, page 299:

Guru Granth Sahib, page 718:

Bhai Gurdas Ji says in his Vaars, page 20:

References

Sikh practices
Economy and religion